Santanyí is a municipality on the Spanish island of Majorca, one of the Balearic Islands, situated in the westernmost part of the Mediterranean Sea.

This municipality in the southeast of Majorca is home to the towns of Santanyí, Calonge, s'Alqueria Blanca and es Llombards, as well as Cala d'Or, Portopetro, Cap d'es Moro, Cala Figuera, Cala Santanyí, Cala Llombards and Cala de s'Almunia. The municipality encompasses a variety of beaches popular for their scenic beauty. The coast covered by the municipality extends around 35 km (21.8 mi) along the southeast coast of the island. It also holds 172 archaeological sites, evidence of the existence of a productive agriculture and farming tradition since at least the Talaiotic period.

Santanyí is also home to a protected natural area known as the Mondragó Natural Parc.

Town 

1 Information from the Spanish National Institute of Statistics

Evolution of the Municipality's population.

Source: Balearic Institute of Statistics

References

External links

 Información del Instituto de Estadística de les Illes Balears
 Ajuntament de Santanyí
 Cala Mondrago

 
Populated places in Mallorca